Ban Sahakon is a tambon (subdistrict) of Mae On District, in Chiang Mai Province, Thailand. In 2018 it had a total population of 3,365 people.

History
The subdistrict was created effective May 1, 1978 by splitting off 7 administrative villages from Rong Wua Daeng, On Nuea, Huai Kaeo.

Administration

Central administration
The tambon is subdivided into 8 administrative villages (muban).

Local administration
The whole area of the subdistrict is covered by the subdistrict administrative organization (SAO) Ban Sahakon (องค์การบริหารส่วนตำบลบ้านสหกรณ์).

Economy
The tambon is home to Mae On Weavers, a group of 100 weavers who make hand-knitted products sold under the banner of Thailand's "One Tambon One Product" (OTOP) program.

References

External links
Thaitambon.com on Ban Sahakon

Tambon of Chiang Mai province
Populated places in Chiang Mai province